In Aztec mythology, Mictlanpachecatl (pronounced: mikt-*lawn-pah-che-kot) is the god of the North wind. His brothers are Cihuatecayotl, Tlalocayotl, and Huitztlampaehecatl, who personify the winds from the west, east, and south respectively.

See also 
 Boreas
 Septentrio

Notes 

Aztec gods
Wind deities